The White Roses of Ravensberg (German: Die weißen Rosen von Ravensberg) is a 1919 German silent drama film directed by and starring Nils Olaf Chrisander. It is based on the 1896 novel by Eufemia von Adlersfeld-Ballestrem which was later adapted into a 1929 film of the same title.

The film's sets were designed by the art director Gustav A. Knauer. It was shot at the Babelsberg Studios and on location around Potsdam.

Cast
 Nils Olaf Chrisander as Fürst Marcel Hochwald 
 Hans Adalbert Schlettow as Graf Ludwig Erlenstein 
 Uschi Elleot as Iris von Ravensberg 
 Frau Marion as Mutter Marie von Ravensberg 
 Erna Thiele as Tochter Sigrid Erlenstein 
 Franz Baumann
 Maud Marion
 Robert Scholz
 Ilse Wilke

References

Bibliography
 Wolfgang Jacobsen. Babelsberg: das Filmstudio. Argon, 1994.

External links

1919 films
Films of the Weimar Republic
Films directed by Nils Olaf Chrisander
German silent feature films
German drama films
German black-and-white films
1919 drama films
Films shot at Babelsberg Studios
Silent drama films
1910s German films
1910s German-language films